Tanpho Wangnaw is an Indian politician from Arunachal Pradesh. He was elected to the Arunachal Pradesh Legislative Assembly from Longding–Pumao Assembly constituency in 2019 Arunachal Pradesh Legislative Assembly election as a member of Bharatiya Janata Party.

References

Living people
Arunachal Pradesh MLAs 2019–2024
1966 births
Bharatiya Janata Party politicians from Arunachal Pradesh
People from Longding district
Naga people